is the largest city in the Chūbu region, the fourth-most populous city and third most populous urban area in Japan, with a population of 2.3million in 2020. Located on the Pacific coast in central Honshu, it is the capital and the most populous city of Aichi Prefecture, and is one of Japan's major ports along with those of Tokyo, Osaka, Kobe, Yokohama, and Chiba. It is the principal city of the Chūkyō metropolitan area, which is the third-most populous metropolitan area in Japan with a population of 10.11million in 2020.

In 1610, the warlord Tokugawa Ieyasu, a retainer of Oda Nobunaga, moved the capital of Owari Province from Kiyosu to Nagoya. This period saw the renovation of Nagoya Castle. The arrival of the 20th century brought a convergence of economic factors that fueled rapid growth in Nagoya, during the Meiji Restoration, and became a major industrial hub for Japan. The traditional manufactures of timepieces, bicycles, and sewing machines were followed by the production of special steels, ceramic, chemicals, oil, and petrochemicals, as the area's automobile, aviation, and shipbuilding industries flourished. These factors made the city a target for US air raids during World War II. 

Following the war, Nagoya's economy diversified, but the city remains a significant centre for industry and transport in Japan. It is linked with Tokyo, Kyōto, and Osaka by the Tokaido Shinkansen, and is home to the Nagoya Stock Exchange as well as the headquarters of Brother Industries, Ibanez, Lexus, and Toyota Tsusho, among others. Nagoya is home of educational institutes such as Nagoya University, the Nagoya Institute of Technology, and Nagoya City University. Famous landmarks in the city include Atsuta Shrine, Higashiyama Zoo and Botanical Gardens, Port of Nagoya Public Aquarium, Nagoya Castle, and Hisaya Ōdori Park, and Nagoya TV Tower, one of the oldest TV towers in Japan.

Overview

Etymology
One possible origin is the adjective , meaning 'calm'
.

The name , consisting of chū (middle) + kyō (capital) is also used to refer to Nagoya. Notable examples of the use of the name Chūkyō include the Chūkyō Industrial Area, Chūkyō Metropolitan Area, Chūkyō Television Broadcasting, Chukyo University and the Chukyo Racecourse.

Cityscape

Geography and administrative divisions

Geography
Nagoya lies north of Ise Bay on the Nōbi Plain. The city was built on low-level plateaus to ward off floodwaters. The plain is one of the nation's most fertile areas. The Kiso River flows to the west along the city border, and the Shōnai River comes from the northeast and turns south towards the bay at Nishi Ward. The man-made Hori River was constructed as a canal in 1610. It flows from north to south, as part of the Shōnai River system. The rivers allowed for trade with the hinterland. The Tempaku River feeds from a number of smaller river in the east, flows briefly south at Nonami and then west at Ōdaka into the bay.

The city's location and its position in the centre of Japan allowed it to develop economically and politically.

Climate
Nagoya has a humid subtropical climate (Köppen climate classification: Cfa) with hot, humid summers and cool winters. The summer is noticeably wetter than the winter, although rain falls throughout the year.

Area

Wards

Nagoya has 16 wards.

Demographics

One of the earliest censuses, carried out in 1889, counted 157,496 residents. Also  an estimated 1,019,859 households resided there—a significant increase from 153,370 at the end of World War II in 1945.

Its metropolitan area extends into the Mie and Gifu prefectures, with a total population of about 10million people, surpassed only by Osaka and Tokyo.

Surrounding municipalities 
 Aichi Prefecture
 Tobishima
 Kanie
 Ama
 Ōharu
 Kiyosu
 Kitanagoya
 Toyoyama
 Kasugai
 Owariasahi
 Seto
 Nagakute
 Nisshin
 Tōgō
 Toyoake
 Ōbu
 Tōkai

History

Origins
Jōmon period
In the Jomon and Yayoi period, the Ōguruwa Shell Midden was discovered before the settlement of Nagoya. 
Kofun period
In the Kofun period, Nagoya was settled and the Danpusan Kofun and Shiratori Kofun was built in this area. The Atsuta Shrine is of ancient origin, it is home to the Imperial Regalia of Japan, the legendary sword Kusanagi no Tsurugi. According to traditional sources, Yamato Takeru died in 113 AD. The possessions of the dead prince were gathered together along with the sword Kusanagi; and his widow venerated his memory in a shrine at her home.

Middle Ages
Heian period
The Seigan-ji was built by the Fujiwara clan in the late Heian period. A member served as the head priest of the nearby Atsuta Shrine, one of the legendary shrines of Japan. It is believed that Yura-Gozen, also known as Urahime, a daughter of Fujiwara no Suenori, was married to Minamoto no Yoshitomo (1123–60) and their son Minamoto no Yoritomo's birthplace is Nagoya, he is also the founder of the Kamakura shogunate.

Early Modern Ages
Azuchi–Momoyama period
Oda Nobunaga and his protégés Toyotomi Hideyoshi and Tokugawa Ieyasu were powerful warlords based in the Nagoya area who gradually succeeded in unifying Japan. In 1610, Tokugawa Ieyasu moved the capital of Owari Province from Kiyosu, about seven kilometers away, to a more strategic location in present-day Nagoya.

In May–June 1560, the Battle of Okehazama took place in Dengakuhazama, Owari Province which was just outside of what would become Nagoya city. In this battle, Oda Nobunaga defeated Imagawa Yoshimoto and established himself as one of the leading warlords in the Sengoku period.

Edo period
During this period Nagoya Castle was constructed, built partly from materials taken from Kiyosu Castle. During the construction, the entire town around Kiyosu Castle, consisting of around 60,000 people, moved from Kiyosu to the newly planned town around Nagoya Castle. Around the same time, the nearby ancient Atsuta Shrine was designated as a waystation, called Miya (the Shrine), on the important Tōkaidō road, which linked the two capitals of Kyoto and Edo (now Tokyo). A town developed around the temple to support travelers. The castle and shrine towns formed the city.

Late Modern Ages
Meiji period
During the Meiji Restoration Japan's provinces were restructured into prefectures and the government changed from family to bureaucratic rule. Nagoya was proclaimed a city on October 1, 1889, and designated a city on 1 September 1956, by government ordinance. Nagoya became an industrial hub for the region. Its economic sphere included the famous pottery towns of Tokoname, Tajimi and Seto, as well as Okazaki, one of the only places where gunpowder was produced under the shogunate. Other industries included cotton and complex mechanical dolls called karakuri ningyō.

Taisho period
Mitsubishi Aircraft Company was established in 1920 in Nagoya and became one of the largest aircraft manufacturers in Japan. The availability of space and the central location of the region and the well-established connectivity were some of the major factors that lead to the establishment of the aviation industry there.

World War II and postwar
Nagoya was the target of US air raids during World War II. The population of Nagoya at this time was estimated to be 1.5million, fourth among Japanese cities and one of the three largest centers of the Japanese aircraft industry. It was estimated that 25% of its workers were engaged in aircraft production. Important Japanese aircraft targets (numbers 193, 194, 198, 2010, and 1729) were within the city itself, while others (notably 240 and 1833) were to the north of Kagamigahara. It was estimated that they produced between 40% and 50% of Japanese combat aircraft and engines, such as the vital Mitsubishi A6M Zero fighter. The Nagoya area also produced machine tools, bearings, railway equipment, metal alloys, tanks, motor vehicles and processed foods during World War II.

Air raids began on April 18, 1942, with an attack on a Mitsubishi Heavy Industries aircraft works, the Matsuhigecho oil warehouse, the Nagoya Castle military barracks and the Nagoya war industries plant. The bombing continued through the spring of 1945, and included large-scale firebombing. Nagoya was the target of two of Bomber Command’s attacks. These incendiary attacks, one by day and one by night, devastated . The XXI Bomber Command established a new U.S. Army Air Force record with the greatest tonnage ever released on a single target in one mission—3,162 tons of incendiaries. It also destroyed or damaged twenty-eight of the numbered targets and raised the area burned to almost one-fourth of the entire city. Nagoya Castle, which was being used as a military command post, was hit and mostly destroyed on May 14, 1945, followed by the Yokkaichi Bombing in June 1945. Reconstruction of the main building was completed in 1959. Later in the same year on July 26, 1945 the Enola Gay also dropped a conventional pumpkin bomb in the Yagoto area of Nagoya as part of a bombing raid in order to train for their mission to Hiroshima. In 1959, the city was flooded and severely damaged by the Ise-wan Typhoon.

Contemporary Ages
After the war the city was able to rebuild and take up its role again as one of the country's leading industrial and manufacturing centers, it became known as the "Houston and Montreal of the Orient". It also plays an increasing role in the meetings, incentives, conferencing, exhibitions (MICE) industry, hosting the Expo 2005 and the Nagoya Protocol conference in 2010.

Public

Police
Aichi Prefectural Police

Atsuta Police Station
Chikusa Police Station
Higashi Police Station
Kita Police Station
Meito Police Station
Midori Police Station
Minami Police Station
Minato Police Station
Mizuho Police Station
Moriyama Police Station
Naka Police Station
Nakagawa Police Station
Nakamura Police Station
Nishi Police Station
Showa Police Station
Tenpaku Police Station

Firefighting
Nagoya City Fire Bureau

Atsuta Fire Department
Chikusa Fire Department
Higashi Fire Department
Kita Fire Department
Meito Fire Department
Midori Fire Department
Minami Fire Department
Minato Fire Department
Mizuho Fire Department
Moriyama Fire Department
Naka Fire Department
Nakagawa Fire Department
Nakamura Fire Department
Nishi Fire Department
Showa Fire Department
Tenpaku Fire Department

Health care
Hospital

Chubu Rosai Hospital
Social Insurance Chukyo Hospital
Nagoya City East Medical Center
Nagoya City West Medical Center
Nagoya City University Hospital
Nagoya Daiichi Red Cross Hospital
Nagoya Daini Red Cross Hospital
Nagoya Ekisaikai Hospital
Nagoya Memorial Hospital
Nagoya University Hospital
National Hospital Organization Nagoya Medical Center

Post office

Atsuta Post Office
Chikusa Post Office
Meito Post Office
Mizuho Post Office
Moriyama Post Office
Nagoya Central Post Office
Nagoya Higashi Post Office
Nagoya Jingu Post Office
Nagoya Kita Post Office
Nagoya Midori Post Office
Nagoya Minami Post Office
Nagoya Minato Post Office
Nagoya Naka Post Office
Nagoya Nishi Post Office
Nakagawa Post Office
Nakamura Post Office
Showa Post Office
Tenpaku Post Office

Library

Aichi Prefectural Library
Nagoya City Library
Nagoya City Atsuta Library
Nagoya City Chikusa Library
Nagoya City Higashi Library
Nagoya City Kita Library
Nagoya City Kusunoki Library
Nagoya City Meito Library
Nagoya City Midori Library
Nagoya City Minami Library
Nagoya City Minato Library
Nagoya City Mizuho Library
Nagoya City Moriyama Library
Nagoya City Nakagawa Library
Nagoya City Nanyo Library
Nagoya City Nishi Library
Nagoya City Nakamura Library
Nagoya City Shidami Library
Nagoya City Tenpaku Library
Nagoya City Tokushige Library
Nagoya City Tomida Library
Nagoya City Tsuruma Library
Nagoya City Yamada Library

Playhouses and cultural facilities

Aichi Arts Center
Atsuta Playhouse
Chikusa Playhouse
Chunichi Theatre
Higashi Playhouse
Kita Playhouse
Meito Playhouse
Midori Playhouse
Minami Playhouse
Minato Playhouse
Misono-za
Mizuho Playhouse
Moriyama Playhouse
Munetsugu Hall
Nagoya Citizens' Auditorium
Nagoya Noh Theater
Nakagawa Playhouse
Nakamura Playhouse
Nishi Playhouse
Osu Engeijo
Showa Playhouse
Shirakawa Hall
Tenpaku Playhouse

External relations

The Nagoya International Center promotes international exchange in the local community. It houses the U.S. Consulate on the 6th floor and the United Nations Centre for Regional Development (UNCRD) on the 7th floor.

Twin towns – Sister cities

International
Nagoya is twinned with:
Sister cities

The sister city relationship with Nanjing, China was suspended on February 21, 2012, following public comments by Nagoya mayor Takashi Kawamura denying the Nanking Massacre.

Partner cities

National
Partner City

Sister ports 
Port of Nagoya's sister ports are:

 Port of Los Angeles, CA United States (1959)
 Port of Fremantle, Western Australia, Australia (1983)
 Port of Baltimore, MD, United States (1985)
 Port of Antwerp, Antwerp Province, Belgium (1988)
 Port of Shanghai, China (2003)
 Port Jackson, New South Wales,  Australia (2010)
 Port of Zeebrugge, West Flanders,  Belgium (2013)

Sister airport 
Nagoya Airfield's sister airport is:
 Grant County International Airport, WA, United States (2016)

Economy 

Nagoya is the center of Greater Nagoya, which earned nearly 70 percent of Japan's 2003 trade surplus.

Automotive industry 
Nagoya's main industry is automotive. Toyota's luxury brand Lexus, Denso, Aisin Seiki Co., Toyota Industries, JTEKT and Toyota Boshoku have their headquarters in or near Nagoya. Mitsubishi Motors has an R&D division in the suburb of Okazaki. Major component suppliers such as Magna International and PPG also have a strong presence here. Spark plug maker NGK and Nippon Sharyo, known for manufacturing rolling stock including the Shinkansen are headquartered there.

Aviation industry 
The aviation history has historically been of importance since the industrialization. During the war the Mitsubishi A6M Zero fighter was constructed in Nagoya. The aviation tradition continues with Mitsubishi Aircraft Corporation headquartered in the Nagoya Airfield's terminal building in Komaki. The Mitsubishi Regional Jet (MRJ) aircraft is produced at a factory adjacent to the airport. The MRJ is a partnership between majority owner Mitsubishi Heavy Industries and Toyota with design assistance from Toyota affiliate Fuji Heavy Industries, already a manufacturer of aircraft. It is the first airliner designed and produced in Japan since the NAMC YS-11 of the 1960s. The MRJ's first flight was on November 11, 2015.

Ceramics 
Japanese pottery and porcelain has a long tradition due to suitable clay being available in Owari Province. Before and during the Edo period there were two main kilns in the region: Seto and Tokoname. In Nagoya Castle a type of oniwa-yaki (literally "garden ware") called Ofukei ware was produced by the feudal lord's court. Almost every feudal lord had his own oniwa-yaki, also to have gifts made. In the town itself Toyoraku ware and Sasashima ware Japanese tea utensils were made with refined tastes. Ofukei ware started under the first Owari lord Tokugawa Yoshinao and was interrupted once, but continued on until the end of the Edo period. It became widely known in Japan. The lord's taste in ceramics was also imitated by other Owari samurai, such as Hirasawa Kurō and Masaki Sōzaburō, who made their own pieces.

Toyoraku ware continued on until the Taishō era under the 8th generation. Colourful pieces and gorgeous tea utensils were highly valued. Sasashima ware also experienced its heyday during this time. Colourful and soft ceramic items such as sake and tea utensils and objects were produced and intently collected.

An early type of manufactured production was the blue-and-white Kawana ware. With the advent of industrialization during the Meiji era of the late 19th century, some export wares were produced. Industrial-scale export porcelain was made by old Noritake, also Nagoya E-tsuke became popular.

Production of industrial ceramics continues to be an important economic factor with companies such as INAX, NGK, and NGK Insulators.

Meetings, Incentives, Conferences, Exhibitions (MICE) 
The city has an increasing role in the meetings, incentives, conferencing, exhibitions (MICE) industry. It hosted in 1989 the World Design Expo (世界デザイン博覧会) for which the Nagoya Congress Center was constructed. It hosted the Expo 2005 and the Nagoya Protocol conference in 2010, as well as the G20 Aichi-Nagoya Foreign Ministers’ Meeting in November 2019, which was held at the Nagoya Kanko Hotel and Kawabun.

Technology 
Mechanized puppets, called "karakuri ningyō", are a traditional craft from the area. Robot technology is another rapidly developing industry.

A materials engineering industry is developing.

Brother Industries, which is known for office electronics such as multifunction printers is based in Nagoya, as is Hoshizaki Electric, which is known for commercial ice machines and refrigeration equipment. Many small machine tool and electronics companies are also based in the area.

The World Expo 2005, also known as Aichi Expo was held near Nagoya in the neighboring cities of Nagakute and Seto from March 25 to September 25, 2005.

Retail 
Retail is of importance in the city. Traditional department stores with roots in Nagoya are Matsuzakaya, Maruei and the Meitetsu Department Store. Oriental Nakamura was bought by Mitsukoshi from Tokyo in 1977.

Arts and crafts 
The Owari province was historically well known for the cloisonné art form. The Ando Cloisonné Company continues the long tradition.

Others 
The confectionery company Marukawa is well known.

The city offers venues for conferences and congresses such as the Nagoya Congress Center and the Nagoya International Exhibition Hall.

Education 

Nagoya has mostly state-run primary and secondary schools. The area in the city limits includes international schools such as the Nagoya International School and Colégio Brasil Japão Prof. Shinoda Brazilian school.

Universities
State and private colleges and universities primarily located in the eastern area. Some Western-style institutions were founded early in the Meiji era, with more opening during the Taishō and Shōwa eras. Nagoya University was set up in 1871 as a medical school and has produced six Nobel Prize laureates in science. Nanzan University was established by the Roman Catholic Society of the Divine Word in 1932 as a high school and expanded to include Nanzan Junior College and the Nanzan Institute for Religion and Culture. The main campus was designed in the 1960s by the renowned architect Antonin Raymond. Some universities specialise in engineering and technology, such as Nagoya University Engineering school, Nagoya Institute of Technology and Toyota Technological Institute; these universities receive support and grants from companies such as Toyota.

Other colleges and universities include: Aichi Prefectural College of Nursing & Health, Aichi Shukutoku Junior College, Aichi Toho University, Chukyo University, Daido University, Doho University, Kinjo Gakuin University, Kinjo Gakuin University Junior College, Meijo University, Nagoya City University, Nagoya College of Music, Nagoya Future Culture College, Nagoya Gakuin University, Nagoya Management Junior College, Nagoya Women's University, St. Mary's College, Nagoya, Sugiyama Jogakuen University, Sugiyama Jogakuen University Junior College, Tokai Gakuen Women's College. Various universities from outside Nagoya have set up satellite campuses, such as Tokyo University of Social Welfare.

The Hōsa Library dates to the 17th century and houses 110,000 items, including books of classic literature such as historic editions of The Tale of Genji that are an heirloom of the Owari Tokugawa and were bequeathed to the city. The Nagoya City Archives store a large collection of documents and books. Tsuruma Central Library is a public library and Nagoya International Center has a collection of foreign-language books.

National Universities
 
 

Prefectural University
 
 

Private Universities

Transportation

Airways

Airport
Nagoya is served by Chubu Centrair International Airport (NGO), built on an artificial island in Tokoname. The airport has international flights and a high volume of domestic flights.

A second airport is Nagoya Airfield (Komaki Airport, NKM) near the city's boundary with Komaki and Kasugai. On February 17, 2005, Nagoya Airport's commercial international flights moved to Centrair Airport. Nagoya Airfield is now used for general aviation and as an airbase and is the main Fuji Dream Airlines hub.

Railways
Nagoya Station, the world's largest train station by floor area, is on the Tōkaidō Shinkansen line, the Tōkaidō Main Line, and the Chūō Main Line, among others. JR Central, which operates the Tōkaidō Shinkansen, has its headquarters there. Meitetsu is also based in Nagoya, and along with Kintetsu provides regional rail service to the Tōkai and Kansai regions.

High-speed rail
JR Central
Tōkaidō Shinkansen line

Conventional lines
JR Central
Tōkaidō Main Line
Chūō Main Line
Kansai Main Line

Subways
Nagoya Subway provides urban transit service.

Buses
Several private and public bus companies operate with of routes throughout the region. Most local bus routes complement existing rail service to form an effective intermodal transit network.
Nagoya Municipal Bus
Meitetsu Bus
Mie Kotsu

Roads

Expressways
Nagoya Expressway
Mei-Nikan Expressway
Tōmei Expressway
Isewangan Expressway
Higashi-Meihan Expressway
Chitahantō Road

Japan National Route

Seaways

Seaport
Nagoya Port is the largest port by international trade value in Japan. Toyota Motor Corporation exports via this port.

Nagoya is known for its orderly grid street plan for which the shōgun Tokugawa Ieyasu is ultimately responsible.

Sightseeing

Nagoya's two most famous sightseeing spots are Atsuta Shrine and Nagoya Castle.

 Atsuta Shrine is the second-most venerable shrine in Japan, after Ise Grand Shrine. It is said to hold the Kusanagi sword, one of the three imperial regalia of Japan, but it is not on public display. It holds around 70 festivals per year. The shrine hosts over 4,400 national treasures that span its 2,000 year history.
 Nagoya Castle was built in 1612. Although a large part of it burned down during World War II, the castle was restored in 1959, adding amenities such as elevators. The castle is famous for two magnificent  on the roof, often used as the symbol of Nagoya.

Other attractions include:

 Gokiso Hachimangū shinto shrine
 Nagoya TV Tower and Hisaya-Ōdori Park, located in the central Sakae district
 JR Central Towers is part of the Nagoya Station
 Midland Square: The new international sales headquarters for Toyota features Japan's highest open-air observation deck.
 The Port of Nagoya area, which includes the former Italian-themed shopping mall called Italia Mura as well as the popular Port of Nagoya Public Aquarium.
 Higashiyama Zoo and Botanical Gardens and the Higashiyama Sky Tower
 The Toyota Commemorative Museum of Industry and Technology near Nagoya station
 Danpusan Kofun : The maximum old burial mound (Kofun) in Aichi.
 The Noritake factory: The home of Noritake fine chinaware is open to visitors and allows people to learn about the history of the establishment. It includes a cafe, information/technology displays, and shopping facilities, so visitors can spend a whole day wandering through the displays and grounds. It also holds a few unrestored areas that serve as reminders of devastation caused by the final stages of World War II.
 The SCMaglev and Railway Park
 The Nagoya/Boston Museum of Fine Arts (N/BMFA)
 The Ōsu shopping district and nearby temples, Ōsu Kannon and Banshō-ji
 The Tokugawa Art Museum and the Tokugawa Garden, a surrounding Japanese garden
 The Nagoya City Science and Art Museums, located in Shirakawa Park, not far from Fushimi Subway Station
 The MUFG Money Museum, now located near the Akatsuka-shirakabe 赤塚白壁 bus stop on Dekimachi-dōri.
 Legoland Japan, Japan's first Legoland resort.

Gallery

Surrounding area
Nagoya is a starting point for visits to the surrounding area, such as Inuyama, Little World Museum of Man, Meiji Mura, Tokoname, Himakajima, Tahara, Toyohashi and Toyokawa and Hamamatsu. Reachable with at most a two-hour journey are Gifu, Gujo Hachiman, Gifu, Ise Shrine, Takayama, Gifu, Gero Onsen and the hill stations in the Kiso Valley Magome and Tsumago.

Culture 

Nagoya was a major trading city and political seat of the Owari lords, the most important house of the Tokugawa clan. They encouraged trade and the arts under their patronage, especially Tokugawa Muneharu, the 7th lord, who took a keen interest in drama and plays and lived lavishly. Under his rule, actors and actresses began to visit Nagoya. Arts and culture was further supported by the city's wealthy merchants. Culture flourished after the feudal Edo period and the beginning of the Meiji era. During World War II many old buildings and artefacts were destroyed. The region's economic and financial power in the post-war years rekindled the artistic and cultural scene.

Museums 
Nagoya has multiple museums, including traditional and modern art, handicrafts to industrial high-tech, natural and scientific museums.

Nagoya Castle's collection is from the Owari Tokugawa era. The main tower is a museum that details the history of the castle and the city. The Honmaru Palace, destroyed in World War II, is slated for reconstruction by 2016 and will again be a prime example of the Shoin-zukuri architecture of the feudal era. Tokugawa Art Museum is a private museum belonging to the Owari Tokugawa, who lived in Nagoya castle for 16 generations.  Among other things, it contains 10 designated national Treasures of Japan, including some of the oldest scrolls of The Tale of Genji. The Nagoya Noh Theatre houses various precious objects of Noh theatre. The Nagoya City Museum showcases the history of the town.

Yōki-sō is a villa and gardens located in Chikusa-ku, close to Nittai-ji. It was constructed in the Taishō era for Ito Jirozaemon Suketami XV, the first president of Matsuzakaya.

Paintings and sculpture are exhibited at the Nagoya City Art Museum. Modern art is displayed at the Aichi Arts Center. The Aichi Arts Center also is the venue of rotating exhibitions. The city is also home to the Nagoya/Boston Museum of Fine Arts, a sister museum to the Museum of Fine Arts, Boston, which was founded to bring aspects of the MFA's collection to Japan.

The art of porcelain and ceramics can be seen at the Noritake Garden. Toyota has two museums in the city, the Toyota Automobile Museum which shows vintage cars, and the Toyota Commemorative Museum of Industry and Technology, which showcases company history, including its start as a textile mill.

The Nagoya City Tram & Subway Museum has trams and subway cars, as well as the Nagoya City Science Museum. The SCMaglev and Railway Park opened in March 2011 with various trains from the Central Japan Railway Company.

Other art museums in Aichi prefecture are the Aichi Prefectural Ceramic Museum and the Toyota Municipal Museum of Art. Meiji Mura is an open-air museum with salvaged buildings from the Meiji, Taishō and Showa eras. Another museum in Nagoya is the Mandolin Melodies Museum.

Other museums in the city include the International Design Centre Nagoya, the Japan Spinning Top Museum and the Bank of Tokyo-Mitsubishi UFJ Money Museum.

The civic authorities promote tourism and have taken steps to safeguard architectural heritage by earmarking them as cultural assets. Apart from the castle, temples, shrines and museums in the city, a "Cultural Path" was instituted in the 1980s, located between the Tokugawa Art Museum and Nagoya Castle. This residential area has historic buildings such as the Nagoya City Archives, the Nagoya City Hall main building, the Aichi Prefectural Office main building, the Futaba Museum, the former residence of Sasuke Toyoda, the former residence of Tetsujiro Haruta and the Chikaramachi Catholic Church. Most buildings date from the Meiji and Taishō era and are protected.

Theatres 
Nō and Kyōgen theatre date back to the feudal times of the Owari Tokugawa lords. The Nagoya Noh Theater at Nagoya Castle continues that tradition and is a prominent feature in the cultural life of the city, with monthly performances.

Developed during the Edo period, one of Japan's kabuki grand stages is Misono-za, which also hosts various other Japanese entertainment such as concerts.

In 1912, the musician Gorō Morita invented the Nagoya harp music instrument.

In 1992, the large, modern Aichi Arts Center was opened in Sakae. It is the main venue for performing arts, featuring a main hall that can be used for opera and theatre and a concert hall. The Nagoya Philharmonic Orchestra performs there, as well as many visiting guest orchestras.

Ikebana 
 is a school of Ikebana, or Japanese floral art. It was founded in 1922 and is headquartered in Nagoya.

Festivals 
Apart from the main national festivals and holidays, other festivals in Nagoya are unique to the city/region.

Major events include the June Atsuta Festival, the July Port Festival, the August Nagoya Castle Summer Festival Castle and the October Nagoya Festival.

Dialect 
The  is spoken in the western half of Aichi Prefecture, centering on Nagoya. It is also called . The Nagoya dialect is relatively close to standard Japanese and to the Kansai dialect, differing in pronunciation and vocabulary.

Handicrafts 
The industry of Japanese handicrafts in the city is centuries old.
 Arimatsu and Narumi dye: during the construction of Nagoya Castle in the 17th century, the lords of Owari called in skilled craftsmen from Bungo Province in Kyushu, known for their tie-dyed fabrics. These craftsmen and their families were treated generously by the Owari and settled in the Arimatsu und Narumi neighbourhoods. Only the base fabric is dyed, leaving parts that were knotted as white spots. This highly specialised process requires 6–12 months to complete.
 Geta clog straps: wooden clogs called geta were the shoes of the feudal era. The Owari devised a unique pattern for the cotton straps of the clogs and ordered them to be made by local weavers. The technique has developed over the generations. The straps became stronger and more resilient but more comfortable for the feet with the discovery of cotton velvet.
 Shippo: the technique for enamelware called shippo arrived from the Netherlands towards the end of the Edo period. The patterns appear almost transparent and are often used on pottery.
 Candles: wax is taken from a wax tree and painted around a rope made of grass and Japanese paper (washi) over and over again into layers. When cut in half, the candle looks as if it grew like a tree with rings. Japanese candles produce less smoke and are harder to blow out, since the wick tends to be larger. Artists paint the candles in coloured patterns.
 Yuzen: the art of silk dyeing was introduced by craftsmen from Kyoto during the rule of Owari Togukawa. The initial designs were extravagant and brightly coloured, but over time became more muted and light-coloured.
 Sekku Ningyo: festival dolls were introduced by markets during the Meiji era. Nagoya craftsmen rank among the top producers.
 The city also gave its name to a type of obi, the sash that is used to tie a kimono. The term Nagoya obi can refer to an older type of obi used centuries ago. This type was cord-like. The current  – or to differentiate from the fukuro Nagoya obi, also called  – is the most-used obi type today. It was developed by a seamstress living in Nagoya at the end of the 1920s. The new, easy-to-use obi gained popularity among Tokyo's geisha, from whom it then was adopted by fashionable city women for their everyday wear. The Nagoya obi was originally for everyday wear, not for ceremonial outfits, but one made from exquisite brocade can be accepted as semi-ceremonial wear.
 Japanese pottery and porcelain has a long tradition due to suitable clay being available in Owari Province. Seto ware and Tokoname ware are from the region. In the town itself Ofukei ware, Toyoraku ware, Sasashima ware and Kawana ware were produced.
 Netsuke artists such as Tametaka and Ikkan were well-known during the Edo period.

Cuisine 
The city and the region are known for its unique local . Dishes include: 
 Tebasaki: chicken wings marinated in a sweet sauce with sesame seeds, basically a type of yakitori
 Tenmusu: a rice ball wrapped with nori that is filled with deep-fried tempura shrimp
 Kishimen: flat udon noodles with a slippery texture, dipped in a light soy sauce soup and a sliced leek or other flavouring added. It can be eaten cold or hot.
 Red miso: various dishes that use red miso, such as miso katsu (pork cutlet) with sweet miso sauce and miso nikomi udon (hard udon stewed in miso soup)
 Hitsumabushi: rice dish with unagi in a lidded wooden container. This dish is enjoyed three ways; as unadon, with spice and as chazuke.

In popular culture
The world premiere of the first Godzilla movie was in Nagoya on October 27, 1954. The city, especially Nagoya Castle, has been featured in two other Godzilla movies: Mothra vs. Godzilla and Godzilla vs. Mothra. The city is also featured in Gamera vs. Gyaos and is the main setting of 2003 film Gozu. The 1995 film The Hunted starring Christopher Lambert and the 1992 film Mr. Baseball starring Tom Selleck were also filmed in the city.

The city was the setting for the 2007 movie Ashita e no yuigon (translated as Best Wishes for Tomorrow), in which a Japanese war criminal sets out to take responsibility for the execution of U.S. airmen. The anime The Wind Rises by Hayao Miyazaki, released in 2013, is a highly fictionalized biography of the Mitsubishi A6M Zero's chief engineer Jiro Horikoshi and takes mostly place in Nagoya of the 1920s and 1930s. Nagoya is also the setting for the manga and anime series Yatogame-chan Kansatsu Nikki, which highlights many of the sites and traditions of the city.

Sports

Nagoya is home to several professional sports teams:

In 2007, the Chunichi Dragons won the Japan Series baseball championship. In 2010, Nagoya Grampus won the J. League championship, their first in team history. Nagoya is also the home of the Nagoya Barbarians semi-pro rugby football club.

A honbasho sumo tournament is held every July at the Aichi Prefectural Gymnasium. The city has hosted The Crowns golf tournament since 1960 and the women's Nagoya Marathon since 1984.

In September 2016 the city was awarded the right to host the 2026 Asian Games after it was the only city to lodge a bid. It will be the third time Japan hosts the event after Tokyo in 1958 and Hiroshima in 1994.

The city hosted the official 1979 Asian Basketball Championship. Later, it became one of the host cities of the official Women's Volleyball World Championship for its 1998, 2006 and 2010 editions.

Notable people

Historical figures
The three samurais who unified Japan in the 16th century all have strong links to Nagoya:
 Oda Nobunaga (1534–1582), from Nagoya Castle in Owari Province
 Toyotomi Hideyoshi (1536–1598), one of Oda Nobunaga's top generals
 Tokugawa Ieyasu (1543–1616), born in Mikawa Province, (the eastern half of modern Aichi prefecture)

Other samurai include:
 Minamoto no Yoritomo (the first shōgun of the Kamakura shogunate)
 Shibata Katsuie (samurai of the Sengoku period)
 Niwa Nagahide (samurai of the Sengoku period)
 Maeda Toshiie (samurai of the Sengoku period)
 Katō Kiyomasa (samurai of the Sengoku period)
 Sassa Narimasa (samurai of the Sengoku period)
 Sakuma Nobumori (samurai of the Sengoku period)
 Sakuma Morimasa (samurai of the Sengoku period)
 Maeda Toshimasu (Maeda Keijirō, samurai of the Sengoku period)

Inventors and industrialists
 Sakichi Toyoda (1867–1930), prolific inventor from Shizuoka Prefecture
 Kiichiro Toyoda (1894–1952), son of Sakichi Toyoda, established Toyota Motor Corporation
 Akio Morita (1921–1999), co-founder of Sony
 Jiro Horikoshi (1903–1982), worked in Nagoya as chief engineer of the Mitsubishi A6M Zero fighter

Executive officers
 Yoichi Wada

Writers
Yokoi Yayū (1702–1783), haiku poet and samurai in Owari Domain
Ryukichi Terao (born 1971), Hispanist and translator of Latin American literature

Scientists
Tsuneko Okazaki (born 1933) pioneer of molecular biology known for her work on DNA replication

Performing artists of Japan

Musicians and composers

 Etsuko Hirose (born 1979), classical pianist
 Moa Kikuchi (born 1999), Japanese musician, singer, dancer, model, and actress (member of the kawaii metal group Babymetal and a former member of the idol group Sakura Gakuin)
 Home Made Kazoku, Japanese hip hop trio
 Yōsei Teikoku, five-member Japanese musical unit
 Spyair, Japanese rock band 
 Kiyoharu (born 1968), Japanese musician and singer-songwriter, known for his work with Kuroyume and Sads
 Koji Kondo (born 1961), Japanese music composer, pianist, and music director who works for the video game company Nintendo. 
 Seamo (Real Name: Naoki Takada, Nihongo: 高田 尚輝, Takada Naoki, born 1975), Japanese hip hop recording artist
 Takanori Iwata (born 1989), Japanese dancer and actor (member of J-pop boygroups Sandaime J Soul Brothers and Exile)
 Naomi Tamura (born 1963), Japanese pop singer and songwriter
 Kazuki Kato (born 1984), Japanese actor, voice actor and singer 
 Lullatone, Japanese musical duo 
 Aya Hirano (born 1987), Japanese actor, voice actor and singer 
 Jasmine You (1979–2009), Japanese musician, best known as original bassist of the symphonic metal band Versailles
 Outrage, Japanese thrash metal band
 Enako (born 1994), cosplayer
 Sho Hirano (born 1997), member of King & Prince
 Kanon Suzuki (born 1998), former idol and singer (former member of Japanese girl idol group Morning Musume)
 Shinichi Suzuki (1898–1998), Japanese musician, philosopher, and educator and the founder of the international Suzuki method of music education and developed a philosophy for educating people of all ages and abilities
 nobodyknows+, Japanese hip hop band
 SKE48, Japanese idol group
 Okada Yukiko (1967–1986), Japanese idol and winner of the talent show Star Tanjō! in Tokyo, Japan
 Coldrain, Japanese rock band
 May'n (Real Name: Mei Nakabayashi, Nihongo: 中林 芽依, Nakabayashi Mei, born 1989), Japanese singer
 Team Shachi, Japanese female idol group 
 Sarah Midori Perry
 Uno Santa
 Kokoro
 Masato Hayakawa (born 1986), lead singer of Coldrain, songwriter and model

Actors
 Kaede Hondo
 Akari Kitō
 Matt McCooey, British actor of Japanese ancestry
 Naoko Mori
 Kaito Nakamura
 The Nose sisters: Anna, Erena, and Karina
 Naomi Kawashima
 Hirotaka Suzuoki
 Hiroshi Tachi
 Emi Takei
 Hiroshi Tamaki
 Kokoro Terada
 Toshihiko Nakajima
 Yūki Yamada

Athletes
 Miki Ando
 Mao Asada
 Mai Asada
 Kazuki Himeno
 Midori Ito
 Jong Tae-se
 Takahiko Kozuka
 Takashi Sugiura
 Último Dragón
 Shoma Uno
 Yoshiaki Oiwa
 Takamoto Katsuta
 Hugh Barter
 Takuma Koga
 Takuma Koga (racing driver)

Manga artists
 Akane Ogura
 Akira Toriyama
 Mohiro Kitoh

References

Bibliography

External links

 Nagoya City official website 
 Nagoya City official website  
 WikiSatellite view of Nagoya at WikiMapia
 Nagoya International Center
 Official Tourism Guide – Nagoya Travel Guide 

 
Cities in Aichi Prefecture
Populated coastal places in Japan
1889 establishments in Japan
Populated places established in 1889
Cities designated by government ordinance of Japan